The Men's 50 metre freestyle S10 event at the 2020 Paralympic Games took place on 25 August 2021, at the Tokyo Aquatics Centre.

Heats
The swimmers with the top eight times, regardless of heat, advanced to the final.

Final
The final took place on 25 August 2021, at 19:06:

References

Swimming at the 2020 Summer Paralympics